A constitutional referendum was held in the Comoros on 30 July 2018. The constitutional amendments proposed would remove the presidential term limits and requirement for the presidency to rotate between the three main islands. Following the approval of the amendments by 92% of voters, President Azali Assoumani will be allowed to run for another five-year term in a vote moved forward to 2019 instead of 2021.

Results

References

2018
2018 referendums
2018 in the Comoros